Abdullah bin Ali bin Jabber Al Zayed (January 1, 1899 – May 5, 1945) was a Bahraini dramatist, poet, and journalist. He was born in Muharraq, the son of a pearl merchant who plied the Persian Gulf. Al Zayed attended the school run by Sheikh Muhammad Saleh Yusuf, a graduate of Al-Azhar University. Although Al Zayed succeeded his father in the pearl trade, he remained in touch with the country’s scholars and authors. Exiled politically to India from 1929 to 1932, he established the first modern printing press in the Gulf States and founded a cultural club in his hometown. In 1939, Al Zayed founded the newspaper Bahrain, which lasted for six years. He wrote stories and plays as well. Mubarak Al Khater compiled, edited, and published Al Zayed’s works in 1996.

Biography
Though some sources give Abdullah bin Ali bin Jabber Al Zayed’s birthdate as January 1, 1899 (19 Sha’ban 1316 AH, others offer 1317 AH or around 1894 C.E. All agree he was born in Muharraq. He learned to write from Sheikh Isa bin Rashid in Muharraq, became a Hafiz (memorizer of the Quran) at an early age, and studied the Arabic language and fiqh (Islamic jurisprudence). After his kuttab education, he moved on to private school and studied Arabic with Sheikh Muhammad Saleh Yusuf at the school run by Ibrahim bin Mohammed bin Khalifa bin Salman Al Khalifa, namesake of today’s Sheikh Ebrahim Center. Al Zayed was one of the founders of the Literary Club of Muharraq and was its secretary. Working in the pearl trade before dedicating himself full-time to the arts, he established Bahrain’s first modern printing press and library in 1932, founded a cinema and theater in 1937, and issued the island’s first newspaper under the name Bahrain, which continued until his death. He co-founded the Committee for Poor Relief and also served as its secretary. Al Zayed also contributed to a number of charities and social activities related to events in Mandatory Palestine.

He died on May 5, 1945 (23 Jumada al-awwal 1364 AH) in Manama.

The Board of Trustees of the Sheikh Ebrahim Center restored his home as a museum of Bahrain’s press heritage in November 2003.

Awards
He won first prize in the London Poetry Competition for his poems, الحرب والحرية (“War and Freedom”) and نهضة الشباب (“Renaissance of Youth”); also, he won third prize for الحنين إلى الوطن (“Homelessness”).

Poetry
According to Abdulaziz Al-Babtain’s biographical dictionary of poets, Al Zayed’s poetry uses "traditional long forms expressed in a direct, reportable manner. Most of his poems revolve around issues salient at the time, such as East-West relations, Arab unity, and liberation from colonialism. His poems sing of the homeland and nostalgia." His poems range from elegies to odes of praise to polemics, and some of the most famous discuss the pain of the human soul, especially in his exile.

Works
 ديوان عبد الله الزائد (“Divan of Abdullah Al Zayed”), 1996 compilation by Mubarak Al Khater
 عدالة الله،(“God’s Justice”), 1934 play
 يوم إنزال السفن (“The Day the Ships Landed”), short story
He also wrote a number of speeches that survive on social and political issues.

References	

Bahraini dramatists and playwrights
Bahraini journalists
20th-century Bahraini poets
Bahraini writers
1899 births
1945 deaths
People from Muharraq